Changjin County is a mountainous county in South Hamgyong Province, North Korea.

Geography
Changjin lies on the Rangrim and Pujŏllyong ranges, and most of the county sits atop the Kaema Plateau.  Due to this location, Changjin has a particularly cold climate. The highest point is Ryŏnhwasan (련화산).  The chief stream is the Changjin River.  Lake Changjin is a large reservoir in Changjin County.

Climate

Administrative divisions
Changjin County is divided into 1 ŭp (town), 3  (workers' districts) and 16 ri (villages):

History
In historical contexts the lake is sometimes known according to its Japanese pronunciation, as the Chōshin Reservoir. In 1950 it was the site of a major battle of the Korean War, the Battle of Chosin Reservoir, in which the Chinese People's Volunteer Army stopped the northward advance of the United Nations allied forces, but paid a heavy price in casualties.

Economy
Changjin produces large amounts of lumber, and leads the province in mine production. Deposits of silver, graphite, jade, and gold are found in the area. Local agriculture is dominated by livestock raising and dry-field farming; local crops include potatoes, barley, soybeans, red beans, maize, and oats.

Jangjin has a hydropower station on the Jangjin river with its construction goals being completed during the 80-day campaign for the 8th congress of the WPK.

Transportation
Although it could long be reached only by horse or automobile, the construction of a power plant on the Changjin River also brought the Changjin Line of the Korean State Railway to the county. Water transportation also developed thanks to the power station.

See also
Geography of North Korea
Administrative divisions of North Korea
Battle of Chosin Reservoir

References

External links

 

Counties of South Hamgyong